The term third wheel refers to someone who is superfluous.

Third wheel may also refer to:

Film or television
The Third Wheel (film), a 2002 American romantic comedy
"The Third Wheel" (That '70s Show), an episode of That '70s Show
"The Third Wheel" (The O.C.), a 2004 episode of The O.C.
"Third Wheel", a 2007 episode of How I Met Your Mother
"Third Wheel", an episode of the Disney Channel series Mickey Mouse

Music

Songs
 "Third Wheel", a 2022 single by Zoe Wees

Other uses
Diary of a Wimpy Kid: The Third Wheel, the seventh book of the Diary of a Wimpy Kid series.
"Third Wheel", a song from The Servants' album Disinterest.

See also
Fifth wheel (disambiguation)
Superfluous (disambiguation)